Spaho is a Bosniak and Albanian surname derived from Ottoman sipahi (known as spahije in Serbo-Croatian). Notable people include:

 Edmond Spaho (born 1958), Albanian politician
 Fehim Spaho (1887–1942), Bosnian Grand Mufti of Yugoslavia
 Mehmed Spaho (1883–1939), Bosnian politician
 Mikel Spaho (born 1982), Albanian footballer
 Norion Spaho (born 1986), Albanian footballer
 Sulejman Spaho (born 1949), Serbian politician

See also 

 Spahić
 Spahia
 Spahija
 Sipahioğlu

Surnames
Bosnian surnames
Albanian-language surnames